The 431st Test and Evaluation Squadron is an inactive United States Air Force unit.  Its last assignment was with the Tactical Air Command 57th Fighter Wing stationed at Nellis Air Force Base, Nevada.   It was inactivated on 30 June 1992.

History

World War II
Established by Fifth Air Force in Australia in May 1943 specifically to accommodate very long range Lockheed P-38J Lightnings at Amberley Airfield in Queensland, Australia. The 431st was specifically trained to provide long-range escort for bombers during daylight raids on Japanese airfields and strongholds in the Netherlands East Indies and the Bismarck Archipelago.  On 14 August 1943, the 431st transferred from Amberley Airfield to Port Moresby. New Guinea.

Engaged in combat operations, providing escort for North American B-25 Mitchell medium bombers that were engaged in strafing attacks on airdromes at Wewak but also destroyed a number of the enemy fighter planes that attacked the formation.  Also intercepted and destroyed many Japanese aircraft which were sent against American shipping in Oro Bay on 15 and 17 October 1943. Covered landings in New Guinea, New Britain, and the Schouten Islands. After moving to Biak in July 1944, the squadron flew escort missions and fighter sweeps to the southern Philippines, Celebes, Halmahera, and Borneo.

Moved to the Philippines in October 1944 and attacked enemy airfields and installations, escorting bombers, and engaging in aerial combat during the first stages of the Allied campaign to recover the Philippines, October–December 1944.  The squadron  flew many missions to support ground forces on Luzon during the first part of 1945. Also flew escort missions to Southeast China and attacked railways on Formosa. Began moving to Ie Shima near Okinawa in August 1945  but the war ended before the movement was completed.

After active combat ended, on 22 September 1945, the squadron moved to Seoul Airfield, Korea for occupation duty as part of the 308th Bomb Wing, assigned to the 315th Air Division of Far East Air Forces. The unit moved to Kimpo Airfield, on 7 January 1946 where it converted to the very long-range P-51H Mustang. The squadron was reassigned to Nagoya Airfield, Japan in March 1947 and later moved to Itazuke Airfield, Japan in August 1948. It became a subordinate unit of 475th Fighter Wing on 10 August.

The squadron was inactivated on 1 April 1949 at Ashiya Airfield, Japan.

Cold War
Reactivated as part of Air Defense Command (ADC) in November 1952, replacing the federalized 172d Fighter-Interceptor Squadron of the Michigan Air National Guard. Stationed at Selfridge Air Force Base, Michigan with mission of air defense of the Detroit/Akron area and Great Lakes initially flying the North American F-86F Sabres reassigned from the 63d Fighter-Interceptor Squadron at Oscoda Air Forcee Base, Michigan.

Relieved from duty with ADC and reassigned to United States Air Forces Europe under Seventeenth Air Force.   Flying from Wheelus Air Base, Libya to provide air defense over the large North African base and expansive training ranges.  Replaced its Korean War vintage F-86F's with new F-86D Sabre interceptors in January 1955.  Moved to Zaragoza Air Base, Spain in September 1958 where new Convair F-102A Delta Dagger interceptors replaced the F-86D's. The unit was reassigned to the Strategic Air Command Sixteenth Air Force.  Inactivated in 1964 with withdrawal of B-47 Stratojet from inventory and SAC turning jurisdiction of its Spanish refueling bases to USAFE.

Was reassigned to Tactical Air Command, being stationed at George AFB, California, assigned to 8th Tactical Fighter Wing.   Equipped with F-4C Phantom II tactical fighter-bomber, engaged in training, participated in numerous exercises, operational readiness inspections, deployments.   Re-equipped with new F-4D Phantom II in 1965 and reassigned to 479th Tactical Training Wing at George AFB. The F-4D was an improved version of the F-4C, which the 8th TFW had been deployed with to Southeast Asia.

In February 1966, the squadron began McDonnell F-4D Phantom II replacement pilot training for personnel to be deployed to Southeast Asia.  Along with the USAF fighter pilot training, the squadron began training foreign personnel in F-4 operations and maintenance in March 1969. Pilots were trained from Israel, Iran, Japan, and West Germany.  Inactivated on 30 October 1970 due to budget reductions.

Reactivated at George Air Force Base in 1975 as part of the 35th Tactical Fighter Wing.  Engaged in F-4E "Wild Weasel" training as a tactical fighter training squadron against Republic F-105G Thunderchiefs.  Inactivated due to budget cuts in 1978.

Fighter Weapons Squadron
Reactivated at McClellan Air Force Base, California in 1980 as a General Dynamics F-111 Aardvark evaluation squadron, assuming mission of Detachment 3, 57th Fighter Weapons Wing, being a geographically separated unit of the 57th Fighter Weapons Wing.   McClellan was the Air Force Logistics Command prime support depot for the F-111 and changes and modifications could be made there and tested by the detachment.

The 431st's mission was to test and evaluate Time Compliance Technical Order modifications to the F-111A/D/E and F models prior to those changes being released to operational F-111 tactical wings in the United States and Europe.  In addition was tasked with exploiting foreign technologies, and developing leading-edge tactics to improve the future combat capability of aerospace forces.

Squadron remained active until June 1992 when the F-111 was retired at the end of the Cold War.

Lineage
 Activated on 14 May 1943 by special authority prior to constitution as 431st Fighter Squadron on 15 May 1943.
 Inactivated on 1 April 1949.
 Redesignated 431st Fighter-Interceptor Squadron on 11 September 1952.
 Activated on November 1952.
 Inactivated on 18 May 1964
 Reactivated and redesignated as 431st Tactical Fighter Squadron, 25 July 1964
 Inactivated on 30 October 1970
 Reactivated and redesignated as 431st Tactical Fighter Training Squadron, 15 January 1976
 Inactivated on 1 October 1978.
 Reactivated and redesignated as 431st Fighter Weapons Squadron, 1 October 1980
 Redesignated: 431st Test and Evaluation Squadron on 30 December 1981
 Inactivated on 30 June 1992

Assignments
 475th Fighter Group, 14 May 1943 – 1 April 1949
 Attached to 347th Fighter Group, 15 November 1947 – 28 August 1948
 4708th Defense Wing, 1 November 1952
 575th Air Defense Group, 16 February 1953
 Seventeenth Air Force, 10 July 1953
 1603d Air Transport (later 7272d Air Base) Wing, 20 July 1953
 7272d Operations Group, 1 March 1958
 65th Air Division, 1 September 1958
 United States Air Forces in Europe
 Attached to 86th Air Division, 1 July 1960 – 18 May 1964
 8th Tactical Fighter Wing, 25 July 1964 – 6 December 1965
 Detached to 479th Tactical Fighter Wing, 6 December 1965 – 14 June 1968
 479th Tactical Fighter Wing, 15 June 1968 – 30 October 1970
 35th Tactical Fighter Wing, 15 January 1976 – 1 October 1978
 57th Fighter Weapons Wing, 1 October 1980 – 30 June 1992

Stations

 Charters Towers, Australia, 14 May 1943
 RAAF Base Amberley Field, Australia, c. 1 July 1943
 Dobodura Airfield Complex, New Guinea, 14 August 1943
 Operated from Port Moresby Airfield Complex, New Guinea, 8 August – 3 October 1943
 Nadzab Airfield Complex, New Guinea, 26 March 1944
 Hollandia Airfield Complex, New Guinea, 15 May 1944
 Mokmer Airfield, Biak, Netherlands East Indies, 15 July 1944
 Dulag Airfield, Leyte, Philippines, 9 November 1944
 Detachment operated from San Jose, Mindoro, Philippines, 5 February – c. 4 March 1945
 Clark Field, Luzon, Philippines, 28 February 1945

 Lingayen Airfield, Luzon, Philippines, 19 April 1945
 Ie Shima Airfield, 8 August 1945
 Kimpo Air Base, Korea, 5 October 1945
 Tachikawa Air Base, Japan, c. 20 February 1947
 Itazuke Air Base, Japan, 15 November 1947
 Ashiya Air Base, Japan, 25 March – 1 April 1949
 Selfridge Air Force Base, Michigan, 1 November 1952 – 23 June 1953
 Wheelus Air Base, Libya, 20 July 1953 – 3 September 1958
 Zaragoza Air Base, Spain, 3 September 1958 – 18 May 1964
 George Air Force Base, California, 18 May 1964 – 30 October 1970; 15 January 1976 – 1 October 1978
 Nellis Air Force Base, Nevada, 1 October 1980 – 30 June 1992
 Operated from McClellan AFB, California. In the early 1990s from Cannon AFB, NM

Aircraft
 P-38 Lightning, 1943–1946
 P-51 Mustang, 1946–1949; F-51, 1952–1953
 F-86D Sabre Interceptor, 1953–1960
 F-102 Delta Dagger, 1960–1964
 F-4 Phantom II, 1964–1970; 1976–1978
 F-111 Aardvark, Various, 1980–1992

References

 * 
 
 

431